George Wilson (born 20 December 1975) is an Australian former rugby league professional footballer who played for Paris Saint-Germain in the Super League and the North Queensland Cowboys in the National Rugby League.

Playing career
A Boonah junior, Wilson was contracted to the Brisbane Broncos in 1994 and 1995 but did not play first grade for the club. In 1996, he joined Paris Saint-Germain in the first season of the Super League. He played nine games, scoring three tries.

In 1998, he was selected for the Queensland Residents while playing for the Dolphins. In 1999, Wilson joined the North Queensland Cowboys.

In Round 10 of the 1999 NRL season, he made his NRL debut, starting at centre in North Queensland's 22–26 loss to the Manly-Warringah Sea Eagles. Wilson left the club at the end of the season after spending the majority of the year playing for the Wests Panthers in the Queensland Cup. While playing for the Panthers, he was again selected in the Queensland Residents side.

In 2000, he rejoined Redcliffe and started on the wing in their 14–6 Grand Final win over the Toowoomba Clydesdales. In 2001, he started at centre and scored a try in the Dolphins' Grand Final loss to the Clydesdales. Wilson finished his Queensland Cup career with 63 tries and five goals in 90 games.

Statistics

NRL
 Statistics are correct to the end of the 1999 season

Super League

References

1975 births
Living people
Australian rugby league players
North Queensland Cowboys players
Paris Saint-Germain Rugby League players
Redcliffe Dolphins players
Wests Panthers players
Rugby league centres
Rugby league wingers